Tallmadge Township may refer to:

 Tallmadge Township, Ottawa County, Michigan (Tallmadge Charter Township, Michigan)
 Tallmadge Township, Summit County, Ohio, former name of the city of Tallmadge

See also

 Tallmadge (disambiguation)

Township name disambiguation pages